Pulchrana baramica, the Baram River frog, brown marsh frog, or masked rough-sided frog, is a species of "true frog", family Ranidae. It is found in the Malay Peninsula, including the extreme south Thailand, Peninsular Malaysia, and Singapore, and in the Malay Archipelago, including Borneo (Brunei, Kalimantan, and East Malaysia), and the Indonesian islands Java, Sumatra, and Bangka Island. Its type locality is the Baram River in Sarawak, Malaysia, giving it one of its common names. Its natural habitats are tropical moist lowland forests and swamps. It is not considered threatened by the IUCN.

References

External links
 
 Sound recordings of Hylarana baramica at BioAcoustica

baramica
Amphibians of Brunei
Amphibians of Indonesia
Amphibians of Malaysia
Amphibians of Singapore
Amphibians of Thailand
Amphibians of Borneo
Fauna of Java
Fauna of Sumatra
Amphibians described in 1900
Taxa named by Oskar Boettger